Meredith McGrath and Larisa Savchenko won in the final 3–6, 6–3, 6–2 against Lori McNeil and Helena Suková.

Seeds
Champion seeds are indicated in bold text while text in italics indicates the round in which those seeds were eliminated.

 Meredith McGrath /  Larisa Savchenko (champions)
 Lori McNeil /  Helena Suková (final)
 Iva Majoli /  Jana Novotná (semifinals)
 Manon Bollegraf /  Kristie Boogert (first round)

Draw

External links
 1996 Faber Grand Prix Doubles Draw

Faber Grand Prix
1996 WTA Tour